TSV Stelingen is a German sports club based in the Stelingen district of Garbsen.  The club's football division notably qualified for the 1986–87 DFB-Pokal, where they were eliminated by Arminia Bielefeld.  They also won the 1986 Lower Saxony Cup.  Volker Finke is the most notable figure associated with the club, which he both played for and managed during his career.

Currently the club participates in the tier seven Bezirksliga Hannover 2.

Honours
The club's honours:
 Lower Saxony Cup
 Winners: 1986

External links
 Official site

Football clubs in Germany
Football clubs in Lower Saxony
Association football clubs established in 1926
1926 establishments in Germany